Làm Lại Từ Đầu is the third studio album by Vietnamese American singer Lâm Nhật Tiến was released on March 3. 1998, under the music label Asia Entertainment Inc. The album is one of the best-selling albums by the year of Asia Entertainment Inc. It was published on Asia's video 31: Giải Âm Nhạc Nghệ Thuật Asia (2000).

Music and production 
This album contains 10 tracks, plus one bonus track: "Đỉnh Gió Hú". It was a big hit by Lam at the beginning of the year 1998. 

Also, including the tracks: "Đừng Nhắc Đến Tình Yêu" & "Về Đâu Hỡi Em" (written by Truc Ho), "Ngày Em Đi", "Tình Yêu Như Mũi Tên" (a Vietnamese version of a popular song: El Choclo, Vietnamese Lyrics by Tran Ngoc Son), "Shalala", "Người Tình Ơi Đừng Xa" (Original: I Love You, a popular Korean pop song was written by Han Dong Joon), "Những Màu Kỷ Niệm" (Original: Eye in the Sky by The Alan Parsons Project, a duet with Le Tam) and "I Could Love Again" (an English song was written by Vu Tuan Duc). 

Music videos by Lam Nhat Tien performing the songs: "Đừng Nhắc Đến Tình Yêu" and "Về Đâu Hỡi Em"  were released on Asia's video 17: Những Tiếng Hát Hôm Nay (1999) and Asia's video 20: Tình Ca Mùa Thu (1998).

Track listing

References 

Lâm Nhật Tiến albums
1998 albums